Dragan Zeković (born May 27, 1987) is a Serbia-born Montenegrin professional basketball player who last played for CSM Oradea of the Romanian League.

Professional career
He began his professional career with Belgrade clubs Avala Ada and Atlas. From 2006 to 2010 he played in Austrian Basketball Bundesliga, first with Vienna and then with Arkadia Traiskirchen Lions. In April 2010 he signed with FMP Železnik. He stayed there till December 2010 when he signed with OKK Beograd till the end of the season. Next two seasons he spent with Vojvodina Srbijagas. In August 2013, he signed with CSU Asesoft Ploiești in Romania. For the 2016–17 season he moved to Karpoš Sokoli. In July 2017, he signed with Steaua București.

Personal life
He is married with Serbian model and former beauty queen Anja Šaranović.

References

External links
 ABA League profile
 Balkan League profile
 Beobasket profile

1987 births
Living people
Basketball players from Belgrade
Basketball League of Serbia players
Centers (basketball)
CSM Oradea (basketball) players
CSU Asesoft Ploiești players
KK FMP (1991–2011) players
KK Avala Ada players
KK Beopetrol/Atlas Beograd coaches
KK Vojvodina Srbijagas players
Montenegrin expatriate basketball people in Serbia
Montenegrin men's basketball players
OKK Beograd players
Power forwards (basketball)
Serbian expatriate basketball people in Austria
Serbian expatriate basketball people in Romania
Serbian expatriate basketball people in North Macedonia
Serbian men's basketball players
Traiskirchen Lions players